Lexington Insurance Company is a surplus lines insurance company wholly owned by AIG. It is one of the largest surplus lines insurer  in the U.S., and it offers property, casualty, and specialty lines insurance products.

History
Started in 1965 with four people and $3 million in gross written premium from its property-casualty business, Lexington was one of the first U.S. insurers formed to specialize in writing surplus lines coverage.

In 1971, Lexington expanded, establishing an office in London. By the 1990s, the company had further grown, establishing programs, healthcare, and catastrophe excess liability divisions.

Divisions
Property, Casualty, Healthcare, Programs, Personal Lines, Captives/ART

Industry practices
Healthcare; Construction; Real Estate; Public Entity; Transportation; Energy; Higher Education

Products 
Lex FloodReady; Significant Other Coverage; Celebrity Product RecallResponse®; CyberEdge® for Healthcare Organizations; Private Market Flood™ Insurance; Mandatory Evacuation Coverage; Lex InlandMarinePlusSM; TIF Protector; Craft Brewery & Winery Program; LexShare™ HOME Rental Coverage; and Robotics Shield.

See also 
 American International Group

References

External links
Official website

Financial services companies established in 1965
Insurance companies of the United States
American International Group